Dick Tracy's G-Men (1939) is a 15-Chapter Republic movie serial based on the Dick Tracy comic strip by Chester Gould.  It was directed by William Witney and John English.

This serial was the fifteenth of the sixty-six produced by Republic and the third Dick Tracy serial (there would be one more, Dick Tracy vs. Crime, Inc., in 1941).  As with all four Dick Tracy serials, Ralph Byrd plays the lead.  This time he faces Irving Pichel as the spy with a vendetta, Zarnoff.  Future Academy Award winner Jennifer Jones co-stars as Gwen Andrews.

"G-Man" is a contemporary slang term for an agent of the FBI.  In the comic strip, Dick Tracy is actually a detective in the police force of an unnamed Midwestern city resembling Chicago.  This was changed for the serial.

Plot
International spy, Zarnoff, in the employ of "The Three Powers" (presumably a fictionalized reference to the Axis) is captured by Dick Tracy at the start of the serial, tried and sentenced to death.  However, through the use of a rare drug embedded by his agents in the evening newspaper, he escapes from the gas chamber.  His men pick up his "corpse" by ambushing the hearse and administering another counter-drug.  He continues his espionage plans, while taking the opportunity of revenge on Tracy.

Cast
 Ralph Byrd as Dick Tracy
 Irving Pichel as Nicolas Zarnoff
 Ted Pearson as Steve Lockwood
 Phyllis Isley as Gwen Andrews.  Phyllis Isley went on to win an Academy Award for best actress four years later in 1943 for The Song of Bernadette, under the screen name Jennifer Jones.
 Walter Miller as Robal, one of Zarnoff's henchmen. This was Walter Miller's last serial, he died shortly afterwards.
 George Douglas as Sandoval, one of Zarnoff's henchmen

Production
Dick Tracy's G-Men was budgeted at $159,876 although the final negative cost was $163,530 (a $3,654, or 2.3%, overspend).  Although the previous serial, Daredevils of the Red Circle, came in under budget that was an exception to the rule.  Most Republic serials were slightly overbudget and this one was not significantly so in comparison.

It was filmed between 17 June and 27 July 1939 under the working title Dick Tracy and his G-Men.  The serial's production number was 896.

This serial, like all the sequels to the 1937 original Dick Tracy serial, was permitted by an interpretation of the original contract, which allowed a "series or serial".  Therefore, Chester Gould was not paid again for the right to produce this serial.

Release

Theatrical
Dick Tracy's G-Men'''s official release date is 2 September 1939, although this is actually the date the seventh chapter was made available to film exchanges.

The serial was re-released on 19 September 1955 following the release of Republic's final serial, King of the Carnival.  Dick Tracy's G-Men began a series of re-releases that accounted for all of Republic's remaining serial releases, finishing with a re-release of Zorro's Fighting Legion'' in March 1958.

VCI released the serial on 2 dvd discs in 2008. It was later released together with the other three Dick Tracy serials in a boxed dvd set by VCI in 2013.

Critical reception
Movie serial historian William C. Cline states that the Dick Tracy serials were "unexcelled in the action field," adding that "in any listing of serials released after 1930, the four Dick Tracy adventures from Republic must stand out as classics of the suspense detective thrillers, and the models for many others to follow."

Chapter titles
 The Master Spy (29min 55s)
 Captured (16min 42s)
 The False Signal (16min 38s)
 The Enemy Strikes (16min 44s)
 Crack-up! (16min 39s)
 Sunken Peril (16min 39s)
 Tracking the Enemy (16min 40s)
 Chamber of Doom (16min 41s)
 Flames of Jeopardy (16min 37s)
 Crackling Fury (16min 40s)
 Caverns of Peril (16min 39s)
 Fight in the Sky (16min 39s)
 The Fatal Ride (16min 40s) - a re-cap chapter
 Getaway (16min 38s)
 The Last Stand (16min 41s)
Source:

References

External links
 
 
 Dick Tracy's G-Men at Todd Gault's Movie Serial Experience

1939 films
American black-and-white films
1930s English-language films
Republic Pictures film serials
Dick Tracy films
Films directed by William Witney
Films directed by John English
American mystery films
1930s mystery films
1930s crime films
1930s police procedural films
1930s American films